The 1976 Derby Borough Council election took place on 6 May 1976 to elect members of Derby Borough Council in England. This was on the same day as other local elections. Voting took place across 18 wards, each electing 3 Councillors. The Conservative Party gained control of the council from the Labour Party.

Overall results

|-
| colspan=2 style="text-align: right; margin-right: 1em" | Total
| style="text-align: right;" | 54
| colspan=5 |
| style="text-align: right;" | 55,448
| style="text-align: right;" |

Ward results

Abbey

Allestree

Alvaston

Arboretum

Babington

Breadsall

Chaddesden

Chellaston

Darley

Derwent

Friar Gate

Litchurch

Littleover

Mickleover

Normanton

Osmanton

Pear Tree

Spondon

References

1976 English local elections
May 1976 events in the United Kingdom
1976
1970s in Derbyshire